Le Théâtre de Dix-Heures (English: The 10 O’clock Theater) was a Lebanese comic theatrical group which functioned between 1962 and 1978 before being revived in 1986. They specialized in comedy.

History
in 1962, le Théâtre de Dix-Heures was established by Gaston Chikhani, Pierre Gédéon, Abdallah Nabbout (Dudul), and Edmond Hanania.

In 1978, Le Théâtre de Dix-Heures made their final performance at the Casino du Liban. 

Eight years later, in 1986, Michel Chikahni, Jean-Pierre Chikhani (Sons of Gaston Chikhani), Pierre Chammassian, and André Jadaa revived the group.

In 1991, Le Théâtre de Dix-Heures achieved international fame when they performed ten plays in eleven years. After that, Michel Jean-Pierre Chikhani continued Le Théâtre. Jadaa and Chammassian left to form Les Diseurs.

Cast
1986: Michel Chikhani, Pierre Chammassian, Jean-Pierre Chikhani, Andre Jadaa, Ramona Cambar

1987 - 1989: Pierre Chammassian, Jean-Pierre Chikhani, Andre Jadaa, Michel Chikhani, Patricia Ghobrile, Najwa Ghanem

1990 - 1996: Andre Jadaa, Michel Chikhani , Pierre Chammassian, Leila Estphan, Chantal Abi Samra, Elissar Khoury

1996 - 2006: Michel Chikhani, Jean-Pierre Chikhani, Mirna Ghaoui, Georges Khoury, Carole Aoun, Sévine Abi Aad, Joseph Karam, Georges Cherfane, Nancy El Ahmar

Theatrical plays
1986–1997Cates sur l'etableJ'y suis j'y resteBaabda La Meen (Baabda Lamine)Min Malja La Malja (part one)Min Malja La Malja (part two)Letletin Ou BassIntikhabet GarabetMaded La NjadedRafaou El 3achraEl Zalami Beki Lal Alfeyn

1997–2006Eymeh, E3dehEl Ossa Wesslet La HaddaLista, Lista, Zay Ma Hiyé

See also 

 Sami Khayat

Sources
Le Théâtre de 10 heures

Theatre companies in Lebanon
Theatres in Lebanon